Han Jiaqi (born 3 July 1999) is a Chinese professional footballer currently playing as a goalkeeper for Chinese Super League club Guangzhou City.

Club career 
Han Jiaqi would make his professional debut for Guangzhou R&F (now known as Guangzhou City) in a league game on 21 April 2019 against Jiangsu Suning in a match that ended in a 5-1 defeat. After only making three appearances throughout the season, within the following campaign at the age of 21 years old would displace the experienced Cheng Yuelei as the club's first choice keeper for the 2020 Chinese Super League season. After keeping his first clean sheet in the Chinese Super League on 16 August 2020 in a 1-0 win against Dalian Professional, he would become a vital member within the team and became the only CSL player to play every minute of the 2020 season.

International career
On 20 July 2022, Han made his international debut in a 3-0 defeat against South Korea in the 2022 EAFF E-1 Football Championship, as the Chinese FA decided to field the U-23 national team for this senior competition. On 24 July 2022, Han kept his first clean sheet for the national team in a 0-0 draw against Japan.

Career statistics

.

References

External links 

1999 births
Living people
Chinese footballers
Chinese expatriate footballers
Association football goalkeepers
Chinese Super League players
C.D. Aves players
Guangzhou City F.C. players
Chinese expatriate sportspeople in Portugal
Expatriate footballers in Portugal